Ossana is a comune (municipality) in Trentino in the northern Italian region Trentino-Alto Adige/Südtirol, located about  northwest of Trento.

The municipality of Ossana contains the frazioni (subdivisions, mainly villages and hamlets) Ossana, Cusiano and Fucine.

Ossana borders the following municipalities: Peio, Vermiglio, Pellizzano, Pinzolo and Carisolo.

Demographic evolution

References

External links
 Homepage of the city

Cities and towns in Trentino-Alto Adige/Südtirol